Concierto de almas is a 1942 Argentine film directed by Alberto de Zavalía.

Cast
Delia Garcés
Pedro López Lagar 
Alita Román
Teresa Serrador 
Carlos Morganti
Ernesto Raquén

References

External links 

1942 films
Films directed by Alberto de Zavalía
1950s Spanish-language films
Argentine black-and-white films
1950s Argentine films